Provincial elections were held in the Pakistani province of Khyber Pakhtunkhwa's constituencies belonging to areas previously known as the Federally Administered Tribal Areas (FATA) on 20 July 2019. After the election, the new members joined the already elected members from the rest of the province to complete the formation of 11th Provincial Assembly of Khyber Pakhtunkhwa.

Background
On 31 May 2018, the former president of Pakistan Mamnoon Hussain signed the landmark Twenty-fifth Amendment to the Constitution of Pakistan which was already passed by the National Assembly of Pakistan and Senate of Pakistan earlier that year. The amendment called for the integration of FATA into Khyber Pakhtunkhwa. It also outlined that provincial elections will be held in areas of former FATA within one year of 2018 Pakistani general election. To fulfill that requirement, the new president of Pakistan Arif Alvi directed the Election Commission of Pakistan (ECP) in late 2018 to conduct the elections in May 2019. ECP started the work to delimit the constituencies. During the delimitation exercise, sixteen new constituencies were created to elect the members on general seats and four reserved seats for women and one for Non-Muslims.

On 6 May 2019, it was announced that the election will be held on 20 July 2019.

285 candidates of different parties including two women candidates ran for elections out of which 202 were Independent candidates. Over 2.1 million voters used their right to vote for the first ever provincial elections.

A total 1896 polling stations were created across the tribal districts out of which 450 polling stations have been declared sensitive.

Polling started in morning 8 till evening 5 without any break.

Results
According to official Results Independents won 6 seats, Pakistan Tehreek-e-Insaf won 5 seats, Jamiat Ulema-e-Islam F won 3 seats, Jamat-e-Islami and Awami National Party won 1 seats each.

Aftermath 
After the elections, five out of the six independents joined political parties. Three joined the Balochistan Awami Party (BAP) and two joined the Pakistan Tehreek-e-Insaf (PTI).

Following this, PTI was declared to have secured two of the four reserved seats for women and the one reserved for minorities. Jamiat Ulema-e-Islam (F) (JUI-F) and BAP each secured one reserved seat for women.

Newly elected members took oath on 27 August 2019.

References

Khyber Pakhtunkhwa provincial
Provincial election
Elections in Khyber Pakhtunkhwa
Khyber Pakhtunkhwa provincial election